Paroy-en-Othe is a commune in the Yonne department in Bourgogne-Franche-Comté in north-central France.

The commune of Paroy-en-Othe was part of Brienon-sur-Armançon between January 1, 1973 and December 31, 2003.

See also
Communes of the Yonne department

References

Communes of Yonne